Swallow Craft (65 Design) Class of Inshore Patrol Vessels are a series of watercraft built by South Korea's Kangnam/Swallow Craft, in Pusan for the Indian Coast Guard.

Design
The vessels in this series are 20 meters long with a beam of 4.8 meters. The hull of each vessel is made of Fiber reinforced plastic (FRP) and they are armed with a 7.62 mm MG. They are powered by two 12V71 TA GM Detroit diesel engines, which generate 840 bhp and drive two propellers. The Swallow Craft class vessels have a crew of 8 enlisted sailors and have a range 400 nmi at 20 knots.

Ships of the class

Specification
Displacement : 32 tonnes
Length : 20.0 meter
Beam : 4.80 meter
Draught : 1.3 meter
Armament : single 7.62 mm MG
Electronic Radar : 1* nav.
Power : 2 GM Detroit Diesel 12V71 TA
Propulsion : 2 propellers, 840 bh
Range : 400 nmi at 20 kn
Crew : 8 enlisted.

See also
 AMPL Class
 Griffon/Grse Class
 Mandovi Marine Class
 Timblo Class
 Bristol Class

References

External links
C-01 and C-06 decommissioned
https://web.archive.org/web/20121031231713/http://indiancoastguard.nic.in/Indiancoastguard/force/force.html

Fast attack craft of the Indian Coast Guard
Patrol boat classes
Ships of the Indian Coast Guard